Melicope jonesii is a species of tree in the family Rutaceae and is endemic to north-east Queensland. It has trifoliate leaves and greenish or cream-coloured flowers borne in short panicles in leaf axils.

Description

Taxonomy
Melicope jonesii was first formally described in 2001 by Thomas Gordon Hartley in the journal Allertonia from specimens collected in 1979 by Bruce Gray. The specific epithet (jonesii) honours the botanist William T. Jones (1908–1970).

Distribution and habitat

Conservation status
This species is classified as of "least concern" under the Queensland Government Nature Conservation Act 1992.

References

jonesii
Sapindales of Australia
Flora of Queensland
Plants described in 2001
Taxa named by Thomas Gordon Hartley